Cathy Reynolds (born July 19, 1957) is an American professional golfer who played on the LPGA Tour.

Career
Reynolds won once on the LPGA Tour in 1981.

Professional wins

LPGA Tour wins (1)

References

External links

Profile on Ozarks Fairways site

American female golfers
Tulsa Golden Hurricane women's golfers
LPGA Tour golfers
Golfers from Missouri
Sportspeople from Kansas City, Missouri
1957 births
Living people